Charles Shepherd may refer to:

Charles Shepherd (photographer) (died 1878), British photographer
Charles Shepherd (character), a character in Ice, a Christian science fiction novel
Charles Shepherd (boxer) (born 1970), former British, Commonwealth and World Super Featherweight boxing champion
Charles Shepherd (field hockey) (1887–1968), Welsh field hockey player
Chuck Shepherd, editor of News of the Weird

See also
Charles Biddle Shepard (1808–1843), Representative from North Carolina
Chuck Shepard, owner of Hoodoo ski area

ĉ